SS Runic was a refrigerated cargo ship built at Harland and Wolff, Belfast in 1949 for the Shaw, Savill & Albion Line. She was launched at Belfast in October 1949, and entered service in March 1950, and was designed for trade between the United Kingdom, Australia and New Zealand.

Like many Shaw, Savill ships, Runic took its name from an earlier White Star Line ship of the same name.

Description
 wide.

Loss
On 19 February 1961 while en route from Brisbane to New Zealand, Runic ran aground on Middleton Reef in the Tasman Sea after sailing through the tail end of a hurricane, despite attempts at salvage, bad weather pushed the ship further onto the reef and it started to flood. On 22 March salvage efforts were abandoned and Runic was declared a constructive total loss, her crew of 69 was evacuated onto the Shaw, Savill ship Arabic and taken to Sydney.

In 2012, the wreck was still partially intact.

References

1949 ships
Ships of the Shaw, Savill & Albion Line
Ships built in Belfast
Ships built by Harland and Wolff
Maritime incidents in 1961
Shipwrecks in the Tasman Sea